Catford is a district in south east London, England, and the administrative centre of the London Borough of Lewisham. It is southwest of Lewisham itself, mostly in the Rushey Green and Catford South wards. The population of Catford, including the Bellingham, London neighbourhood, was 44,905 as of 2011.

The area is identified in the London Plan as one of 35 major centres in Greater London.

History

Toponymy

The origin of the name is unknown. Speculation suggests it may derive from the place where cattle crossed the river Ravensbourne in Anglo-Saxon times or from wild cats using the river crossing.

Catford covers most of SE6 postcode district. The area is identified in the London Plan as one of 35 major centres in Greater London.

Governance
Catford is covered by the Rushey Green and Catford South wards in the London Borough of Lewisham. It also makes up a large part of the Lewisham East constituency.

Built environment

Early developments
Broadway Theatre is an art deco building adjoining the town hall. It is a curved stone structure decorated with shields and heraldic emblems and topped with a copper-green spire. It was opened in 1932 as the Concert Hall and is now a Grade II listed building. The interior is in art deco style. The last cinema in the borough (before the 2019 launch of Catford Mews) stood diagonally opposite the theatre until its closure in 2002. Catford also boasts a large Gothic police station. In 2006, a large blue pipe sculpture was unveiled outside Eros House, which was another former cinema (The Eros Cinema), and the Lewisham Hippodrome theatre.

The 1960s and 70s had a considerable impact on the architecture of Catford. The old Town Hall of 1875, was replaced by the current Civic Suite in 1968, soon after the merger of the metropolitan boroughs of Lewisham and Deptford. Laurence House, where many of the Lewisham Council functions are housed including the offices of the Mayor of Lewisham and the Young Mayors of Lewisham, is on the site of old St Laurence's Church. The original Gothic C of E St. Laurence Church was located where Laurence House is today (known as the Catford Cathedral), but as part of the urban renewal of Catford in the 1960s, the church is now housed in a more modern style building 200 metres down Bromley Road. 

In Rushey Green the old village water hand-pump from the 1850s survives.

At the end of World War II, the 186-bungalow Excalibur Estate was laid out in Catford, and by 2011 was the largest surviving prefab estate in Britain. However, in spite of the opposition of many residents, all are due for demolition, apart from six with Grade II listing. A new estate on the site is due for completion by the end of 2023.

Brutalist architecture
A few examples of Brutalist architecture survive including the Catford shopping centre and Milford Towers, designed by the architect Owen Luder in 1974. The design was to make it the Barbican of the south.

Architecture critic Ian Nairn praised Eros House (Owen Luder, 1962) as:

A monster sat down in Catford and just what the place needed. No offence meant: this southward extension of Lewisham High Street badly wanted stiffening. Now there is a punchy concrete focus ('you know, that funny new building') both close to and at a distance, from the desolate heights of the Downham Estate, where it stands straight to the afternoon sun. Rough concrete is put through all its paces, front convex eaves on Sainsbury's to a staircase tower which is either afflicted with an astounding set of visual distortions or is actually leaning. Again, no offence meant. Unlike many other avant-garde buildings, particularly in the universities, this one is done from real conviction, not from a desire for self-advertisement. The gaunt honesty of those projecting concrete frames carrying boxed-out bow windows persists. It is not done at you and it transforms the surroundings instead of despising them. This most craggy and uncompromising of London buildings turns out to be full of firm gentleness.

In 2015 Lewisham Council decided to demolish Milford Towers, as the housing estate was in disrepair and the land could be better used to meet the needs of local residents. In 2018 the estate was however refurbished, with demolition still planned in the longer-term.

Landmarks

Catford's most prominent landmark is the Catford Cat, a giant fibreglass sculpture of a black cat above the entrance to the Catford  centre. There is also a street market on Catford Broadway.

Between 1932 and 2003, Catford Stadium was a successful greyhound racing track, but was closed and then destroyed by fire in 2005 and ultimately demolished to make way for new housing.

Catford's oldest pub is the Black Horse and Harrow (now named The Ninth Life). The Catford Bridge Tavern is another heritage listed building close to the old dog track; this mock tudor pub burnt down in March 2015, but has since been refurbished and reopened in April 2017. Nearby, is St Dunstan's College.

The area was once home to the Catford Studios, producing films during the silent era. Catford also used to have a cinema diametric to the theatre. Catford was also satirised in The Chap magazine in a series called 'A Year in Catford' named after Peter Mayle's best-seller A Year in Provence. The magazine poked fun at Catford's mundanity.

Regeneration
Catford town centre is a priority area for regeneration in the London Borough of Lewisham. Several key sites around the town centre have been identified for redevelopment – Milford Towers, Catford Island, The Civic Centre, Lewisham Town Hall and The "Wickes" site have all been highlighted for significant change in the proposed Catford Plan.

The council's aspiration is for the complete redevelopment of the Catford Shopping Centre and Milford Towers, which would require demolition of both plus the car parks and associated buildings along Thomas Lane. However, attempts to regenerate Catford have been hampered by various complex issues such as finance and the number of different landowners in and around the town centre.

Transport

Rail
Catford is served by two railway stations, Catford and Catford Bridge. Catford provides the area with Thameslink services to Kentish Town, London Blackfriars, Orpington via Bromley South and to Sevenoaks via Bromley South and Swanley. Catford Bridge is served by Southeastern services to London Charing Cross, London Cannon Street via Lewisham and to Hayes.

Buses
Catford is served by many Transport for London bus routes.

Road
Catford's main road is the A205 South Circular which crosses South London, running from Woolwich in the east to the junction of the A406 (North Circular Road), the M4 and the A4 at Gunnersbury in the west.

Proposed transport links

Bakerloo line extension
There are proposals for a Bakerloo line extension to Lewisham, with a possible longer-term second phase to  Catford and Hayes. As of 2022, no final decisions had been made.

Docklands Light Railway extension
Transport for London (TfL) are currently considering the extension of the Docklands Light Railway from Lewisham to Bromley, with the first phase being from Lewisham to Catford. So far TfL have not expressed a preferred route, provided detailed plans, or indicated costs and funding. Lewisham Council has suggested that any route should be underground to reduce physical and visual impact.

Education

Local authority maintained schools
The local council maintains Conisborough College and Greenvale School.

Independent schools
Catford has two independent schools, St Dunstan's College and a small faith school, Springfield Christian School.

Parks and greenspaces

River Pool Linear Park
The walk follows the River Pool downstream from the Ravensbourne River. The banking has been planted with native trees and shrubs, herbaceous planting, wild flower grassland and wetland marginal planting. The park forms part of the Waterlink Way which forms a significant section of the river from Sydenham to the Thames.

Unlike many of London's rivers, the Pool remains above ground for most of its length. The section of river flows through a linear park from Southend Lane to Catford Hill.

Mountsfield Park
In the 1920s, Charlton Athletic played at The Mount (stadium) in the park. The Council holds its annual People's Day event here in July.

Ladywell Fields
The park consists of three fields with a river running through them, and is next to University Hospital Lewisham. The middle field contains one of the last established rare Dutch Elm trees in London.

Iona Close Orchard
Iona Close Orchard is a preserved Victorian garden. In common with most old orchards, the site is of high nature conservation value. The houses to which it originally belonged dated to about 1825.

Sport

Facilities
The 20-acre Jubilee Ground is operated by St Dunstan's College.

Catford Stadium was one of the greyhound racing venues in the UK until its closure and subsequent demolition in 2005. It also hosted boxing and several other sporting events.

Local sports teams
Catford has a Non-League football club Lewisham Borough F.C. who play at the Ladywell Arena.

Kent County Cricket Club have played at Catford several times in the past.

The Catford Cycling Club was founded in 1886. In 1894 they built their own track south of Brownhill Road with a pagoda grandstand. By the 1950s the majority of the track had been built over but the club still exists.

Gallery

Notable residents
 Jak Airport, guitarist of punk band X-Ray Spex and new wave band Classix Nouveaux, was born and raised there.
 Ray BLK, British singer and songwriter.
 Captain William Colbeck (seaman) (1871–1930), Antarctic explorer, lived in Inchmery Road. His sons went to St Dunstan's.
 Maxwell Confait, Colin Lattimore, Ronal Leighton and Ahmet Salih. See The Murder of Maxwell Confait.
 Henry Cooper, British heavyweight boxer came from the area.
 Ernest Christopher Dowson, poet and decadent lived and died in Catford. Dowson introduced the phrases 'Days of wine and roses' and 'Gone with the wind'.
 Leslie Dwyer, actor, was born in Catford.
 Ben Elton, comedian and writer, was born in Catford in 1959.
 Henry Forster, 1st Baron Forster – Forster Park is named after him.
 Joe Gomez, defender for Liverpool F.C. Born in Catford.
 Japan (band), 1980s new wave band. Vocalist David Sylvian, bassist Mick Karn, drummer Steve Jansen and keyboardist Richard Barbieri all grew up in Catford and attended Catford Boys School.
 Anthony Jones, art photographer lives in the area.
 Jem Karacan, international footballer, born in Catford. 
 George Arthur Knowland, recipient of the Victoria Cross.
 Ethel Le Neve, mistress of Dr Crippen, hanged for the murder of his wife.
 Lucy Mangan columnist for The Guardian newspaper lived in Catford for more than thirty years.
 Andy McNab, former serviceman in the Special Air Service (SAS) and writer was born in Catford.
 Alexander McQueen, fashion designer was born in Lewisham
 Jacqui McShee, folk singer and co-founder of Pentangle.
 Spike Milligan (1918–2002), comedian and writer went to school at Catford's Brownhill Boys' School. He claimed to have lived in Catford and wrote about the area in his books and sketches. In reality he lived in nearby Honor Oak.
 Frank Pullen, the property developer and racehorse owner was born in Catford and opened the first of his shops on Catford Broadway.
 Bernard Sunley, property developer and philanthropist, born in Catford in 1910.
 Robin Trower, Guitarist, Procol Harum, and extensive solo career.
 Tom Stabb, co-host of Alan Partridge-based podcast 'Monkey Tennis' resides in Catford.
 Robert Stanford Tuck, Second World War fighter ace.
 Chris Welch, music journalist and author, was raised in Catford.

Geography

Other nearby areas

Lewisham 
Brockley 
Ladywell
Bellingham, London
Downham 
Grove Park 
Lee, London
Sydenham 
Forest Hill 
Beckenham 
Bromley
Peckham

References

External links

 Catford from the OpenStreetMap
 Catford - a short history from Ideal Homes website
 History of Catford from The South London Guide
 Catford Dog Track from Derelict London website
 Catford's 'Lewisham Hippodrome' (now demolished) from Ideal Homes website
 Parish church of the part of Catford south of Catford bridge
 Catford community portal and information web site

 
Districts of the London Borough of Lewisham
Areas of London
Major centres of London